Four-time defending champion Roger Federer defeated Rafael Nadal in the final, 7–6(9–7), 4–6, 7–6(7–3), 2–6, 6–2 to win the gentlemen's singles tennis title at the 2007 Wimbledon Championships. It was Federer's Open Era record-equaling fifth consecutive Wimbledon title (tying Björn Borg), his fifth Wimbledon title overall, and his eleventh major title overall. It was the second of three consecutive years that Federer and Nadal would contest the Wimbledon final.

By winning his first round match against Lee Childs, Aisam-ul-Haq Qureshi became the first Pakistani player to win a major singles match.

Seeds

  Roger Federer (champion)
  Rafael Nadal (final)
  Andy Roddick (quarterfinals)
  Novak Djokovic (semifinals, retired)
  Fernando González (third round)
  Nikolay Davydenko (fourth round)
  Tomáš Berdych (quarterfinals)
  Andy Murray (withdrew)
  James Blake (third round)
  Marcos Baghdatis (quarterfinals)
  Tommy Robredo (second round)
  Richard Gasquet (semifinals)
  Tommy Haas (fourth round, withdrew)
  Mikhail Youzhny (fourth round)
  Ivan Ljubičić (third round)
  Lleyton Hewitt (fourth round)

  David Ferrer (second round)
  Jarkko Nieminen (third round)
  Jonas Björkman (fourth round)
  Juan Carlos Ferrero (quarterfinals)
  Dmitry Tursunov (third round)
  Guillermo Cañas (third round)
  David Nalbandian (third round)
  Juan Ignacio Chela (second round)
  Carlos Moyá (first round)
  Marat Safin (third round)
  Philipp Kohlschreiber (first round)
  Robin Söderling (third round)
  Agustín Calleri (second round)
  Filippo Volandri (first round)
  Dominik Hrbatý (first round)
  Juan Mónaco (first round)

Mario Ančić was originally seeded #18 but withdrew due to illness before the tournament draw was made. All original seeds from 19 to 31 moved up one place, and a new #31 seed was added.

Andy Murray withdrew due to a wrist injury. He was replaced in the draw by lucky loser Kevin Kim.

Qualifying

Draw

Finals

Top half

Section 1

Section 2

Section 3

Section 4

Bottom half

Section 5

Section 6

Section 7

Section 8

References

External links

 2007 Wimbledon Championships – Men's draws and results at the International Tennis Federation

Men's Singles
Wimbledon Championship by year – Men's singles